The Renegade (Spanish: La renegada) is a 1951 Cuban drama film directed by Ramón Peón and starring Rita Montaner. It is a melodrama, influenced by the success of similar Mexican films of the era.

Cast
 Gina Cabrera 
 Alberto González Rubio 
 Yadira Jiménez 
 Rita Montaner 
 Enrique Santisteban

References

Bibliography 
 Antoni Kapcia. Havana: The Making of Cuban Culture. Bloomsbury Academic, 2005.

External links 
 

1951 films
1950s Spanish-language films
Cuban drama films
1951 drama films
Films directed by Ramón Peón